Estradiol dienanthate (EDE), sold under the brand names Climacteron among others, is a long-acting estrogen medication which was previously used in menopausal hormone therapy for women and to suppress lactation in women. It was formulated in combination with estradiol benzoate (EB), a short-acting estrogen, and testosterone enanthate benzilic acid hydrazone (TEBH), a long-acting androgen/anabolic steroid. EDE has not been made available for medical use alone. The medication, in combination with EB and TEBH, was given by injection into muscle once or at regular intervals, for instance once every 6 weeks.

Side effects of EDE include breast tenderness, breast enlargement, nausea, headache, and fluid retention. EDE is an estrogen and hence is an agonist of the estrogen receptor, the biological target of estrogens like estradiol. It is an estrogen ester and a prodrug of estradiol in the body. Because of this, it is considered to be a natural and bioidentical form of estrogen.

EDE was first described by 1959. It was previously available in Canada and Germany but was discontinued by 2005. The medication is no longer available in any form.

Medical uses
EDE, a long-acting estrogen, was used in combination with EB, a short-acting estrogen, and TEBH, a long-acting androgen/anabolic steroid, in menopausal hormone therapy in perimenopausal, postmenopausal, hypogonadal, and oophorectomized women, as well as for suppression of lactation in postpartum women.

Available forms

EDE was available only in combination EB and TEBH. The combination was available in two different dose forms, one for menopausal hormone therapy (brand names Climacteron, Amenose) and the other for lactation suppression (brand names Lactimex, Lactostat). Climacteron and Amenose contained 1.0 mg EB, 7.5 mg EDE, and 150 mg TEBH (69 mg free testosterone) and was given by repeated intramuscular injection at regular intervals. Lactimex and Lactostat contained 6 mg EB, 15 mg EDE, and 300 mg TEBH in 2 mL of corn oil and was administered as a single intramuscular injection after childbirth or during breastfeeding.

Pharmacology

Pharmacodynamics

EDE is an estradiol ester, or a prodrug of estradiol. As such, it is an estrogen, or an agonist of the estrogen receptors. EDE is of about 82% higher molecular weight than estradiol due to the presence of its C3 and C17β heptanoate (enanthate) esters. Because EDE is a prodrug of estradiol, it is considered to be a natural and bioidentical form of estrogen.

Pharmacokinetics

Estradiol and testosterone levels following a single intramuscular injection of Climacteron (including 1 mg EB, 7.5 mg EDE, and 150 mg TEBH equivalent to 69 mg free testosterone) versus 10 mg estradiol valerate have been studied over 28 days.

Chemistry

EDE is a synthetic estrane steroid and the C3 and C17β heptanoate (enanthate) diester of estradiol. It is also known as estradiol 3,17β-heptanoate or as estra-1,3,5(10)-triene-3,17β-diol 3,17β-diheptanoate. EDE is structurally related to estradiol enanthate (estradiol 17β-heptanoate), which has a single heptanoate ester rather than two.

History
EDE was first described and introduced for medical use by 1959.

Society and culture

Brand names
EDE was marketed in combination with EB and TEBH under the brand names Climacteron, Amenose, Lactimex, and Lactostat.

Availability
EDE is no longer available but was previously used in Canada, Germany and other countries.

See also
 Estradiol benzoate/estradiol dienanthate/testosterone enanthate benzilic acid hydrazone

References

Abandoned drugs
Enanthate esters
Estradiol esters
Prodrugs
Synthetic estrogens